Mitchel Stuart Godden  

Current British 500cc Grasstarck Sidecar Champion.  Team Godden / Smith 

Mitchel is an English Motorcycle rider who competes in Longtrack and Grasstrack Racing for Solos (1992>) and more recently 500cc Sidecars (2015>) 

He is the son of Don Godden who won the Individual Speedway Long Track World Championship in 1969. 

Mitchel Godden followed in his fathers footsteps and started racing in 1992. He started on a 250cc (ex Jeremy Doncaster) Honda red Rocket and rode this for one season before using Godden works 350cc machine and then after a couple of seasons progressed to 500cc class. Mitch later progressed to international racing becoming a specialists on German Grasstracks and Dutch Sandtracks. He often travelled to many of his European meetings with other riders, notably Trevor Banks the late Vincent Kinchin and “Super” Dave Mears among others.

In 2015 Mitchell went in to 500cc Sidecar racing and has again had massive success in the UK but especially on the continent. Along with his long term passenger Paul Smith they have quickly become one of the best crews in Europe. They have won international events in Werlte, Ludinghausen, Osnabrook, Hertingen  Berghaupten, Bielefeld, Rastede & Angenrod, (Germany) and Roden & Eenrum in the Netherlands amongst others and with his flamboyant and never say die racing attitude they have delighted the European crowds with fantastic racing action. A close connection with long time friend and ex racer Gary Southgate helped and encourage the change in direction from 2 wheels to 3 after trail success in 2014.

Using his track racing knowledge and engineering background Mitchel is now making and producing his own complete 500cc Sidecar machined known as Zircon Racing. Although this is not on a commercial basis if his own results are anything to go by they have already proven themselves to be world beaters. The team Godden/Smith raced to an impressive 19 podiums from 22 starts in 2017, 18 podiums from 23 starts in 2018 and 21 podiums from 23 starts in 2019, and 15 podiums from 16 starts in 2022 including 8 first places, with most events being fought of foreign soil.

FIM SIDECAR European Championship

Mitchel & Paul finished an incredible 4th in their first attempt at the European title in Tayac France July 2017, 2nd in the 2018 FIM-Europe Championship in Werlte Germany July 2018, 3rd in 2019 FIM-E Championship in Eenrum Netherlands August 2019, 2nd in 2022 FIM-E Championship in Eenrum Netherlands August 2022. 

The team have the prestigious accolade of being the only British team in history to hold 3 European championships medals and the only team in British history to win a championship medal(s) on foreign soil.

The team won their first British 500cc sidecar championship in 2021, after several near misses in the years before, taking the title with an unbeaten performance. This was followed by taking their second and successive British title in 2022.

Promotion
In recent year Mitchell has also turned his hand to promotion. He started the charity Kart meeting at Buckmore Park as well as promotion and running of the Invicta International Grasstrack meetings at the Hop Farm and Collier Street 'The Kings of Speed' in 2008, 2011 and 2012. In 2016 he started the Pit Bike Winter Series at Iwade Stadium.

Management
In 2013 Mitchell on behalf of the ACU took over the manager role of the Great Britain World Longtrack team. In 2013 he led the team to the bronze medal and 2015 he led the team to their only championship. His last year in the role will be 2018.

World Longtrack Championship

Individual Championship
 1999 4 app (16th) 18pts

Team Championship

Rider
 2007  Morizes – Second (with Paul Hurry, Andrew Appleton, Glen Phillips)
 2008  Werlte  – Third (with Richard Hall, Glen Phillips, Vince Kinchin)
 2011  Scheeßel – Third (with Paul Cooper, Andrew Appleton, Glen Phillips)

Manager
 2013  Folkestone – Third (with Richard Hall, Andrew Appleton, Paul Cooper, Glen Phillips)
 2014  Forssa – Fifth (with Andrew Appleton, Richard Hall, David Howe, Glen Phillips)
 2015  Mühldorf – First (with Andrew Appleton, Richard Hall, James Shanes, Glen Phillips)
 2016  Marianske Lazne – Fourth (with Andrew Appleton, Richard Hall, James Shanes, Glen Phillips)
 2017  Roden – Fourth (with Andrew Appleton, Richard Hall, James Shanes, Edward Kennett)
 2018  Morizes – Second (with James Shanes, Chris Harris, Zach Wajtknecht, Adam Ellis)

European Grasstrack Championship

Solos Finals

 2004  Eenrum (14th) 4pts
 2008  Siddeburen (10th) 11pts
 2010  La Reole (12th) 9pts
 2011  Skegness (8th) 14pts
 2012  Eenrum (14th) 6pts
 2015  Staphorst (11th) 6pts
 2016  Folkestone (14th) 3pts

Solos Semi-finals
 2000 Semi-finalist
 2003 Semi-finalist
 2005 Semi-finalist
 2006 Semi-finalist
 2009 Semi-finalist
 2014 Semi-finalist

Sidecar Finals
 2017  Tayac (4th) 7pts
 2018  Wertle (2nd) 17pts
 2019  Eenrum (3rd) 18pts
 2022  Eenrum (2rd) 17pts

British Masters Grasstrack Championship

Top Ten Finishes
 2005  Northiam (9th)
 2006  Wadebridge (7th)
 2007  Long Marston (9th)
 2008  Rhodes Minnis (4th)
 2010  Rhodes Minnis (5th)
 2013  Uddens (7th)
 2014  Swingfield (6th)
 2015  Corfe Mullen (9th)
 2021  Swingfield (3rd)
Other Appearances: 1994, 1995, 1996, 1997, 1998, 1999, 2000, 2001, 2002, 2003, 2009, 2011, 2012.

British Sidecar Championship
 2016  Frittenden (Second)
 2017  Ledbury (Second)
 2018  Chelmsford (Third)
 2019  Chelmsford (Disqualified)
 2021  Ledbury (First)
 2022  Frittenden (First)

British Sand Ace Championship
 2006  Guernsey (Champion)
 2007  Guernsey (Champion)
 2008  Guernsey (5th)
 2009  Guernsey (Champion)
 2010  Guernsey (Champion)
 2011  Guernsey (Champion)
 2012  Guernsey (Third)
 2013  Guernsey (18th)
 2014  Guernsey (5th)
 2015  Guernsey (6th)

Sources
 Grasstrackgb
 Polish Historia
 Family History
 Longtrack History

Individual Speedway Long Track World Championship riders
English motorcycle racers
1975 births
Living people
People from Pembury